Zoila Frausto (born December 10, 1983) is an American kickboxer and former professional mixed martial artist. She was the first Bellator Women's Champion.

Background
Zoila is of Mexican descent and heritage. Zoila's father is a third-degree black belt in tae kwon do. Her sister is MMA fighter Stephanie Frausto. She graduated from Madera High School in 2002 and attended Fresno City College.

Mixed martial arts career
Frausto debuted in mixed martial arts on February 13, 2009 and faced Karina Hallinan at WarGods: Valentine's Eve Massacre. She defeated Hallinan by Split Decision.

She next faced Sarah Boyd on June 27, 2009 at Disturbing The Peace in Fresno, California. Frausto won the fight by Unanimous Decision.

On July 25, 2009, Frausto  fought a debuting Leeann Jenkins at Pure Combat 9 – Home Turf. She won the fight by Unanimous Decision.

Frausto faced Elisha Helsper, who was coming back from a 3-year layoff, at Strikeforce Challengers: Gurgel vs. Evangelista on November 6, 2009, and won the fight by Unanimous Decision.

She next faced Jessica Rakoczy at Tachi Palace Fights 3 – Champions Collide on February 4, 2010. Frausto won the fight by armbar submission in the first round.

Frausto faced Miesha Tate on March 26, 2010, at Strikeforce Challengers: Johnson vs. Mahe. She lost the fight by armbar submission in the second round.

On May 16, 2010, Frausto dropped down to 125 pounds to face Michelle Ould at TWC 8 – Meltdown in Porterville, California. She was awarded a victory by verbal submission due to an ankle injury Ould sustained while taking Frausto down.

Bellator Fighting Championships
Frausto faced Rosi Sexton at Bellator 23 on June 24, 2010. She defeated Sexton by knockout due to a knee exactly two minutes into the first round.

She entered the Bellator Season Three 115-pound women's tournament at Bellator 25 and faced Jessica Penne in the opening round. Frausto won the fight via unanimous decision.

Frausto faced Jessica Aguilar in the second round of the Bellator tournament at Bellator 31. She defeated Aguilar via split decision and went on to face Megumi Fujii in the tournament final at Bellator 34 on October 28, 2010. Frausto won a decision, handing Fujii her first professional defeat and becoming the inaugural 115-pound women's champion.

Frausto faced Karina Hallinan at Bellator 35 in a non-title match on March 5, 2011 in Lemoore, California. She won the fight via unanimous decision but suffered a right hand fracture.

Frausto agreed to rematch Jessica Aguilar in a non-title bout at a Bellator event in late October. However, Aguilar withdrew from the planned fight while recovering from foot surgery and Frausto was booked to face Carina Damm at Bellator 57 on November 12, 2011. Frausto withdrew from the bout on October 20 after suffering a torn ACL in training and was sidelined for a year.

Frausto made her return on October 26, 2012 at Bellator 78 in Dayton, Ohio. She defeated Casey Noland by unanimous decision.

Frausto  next faced Jessica Eye at Bellator 83 on December 7, 2012. She was defeated when Eye won via standing arm-triangle choke.

Invicta Fighting Championships
On February 5, 2013, it was announced that Frausto had signed a multi-fight deal with Invicta Fighting Championships. Also in 2013, she vacated her Bellator title. The Bellator women's division was dropped later that year in August.

She faced Jennifer Maia at Invicta FC 5: Penne vs. Waterson on April 5, 2013. Frausto lost the fight via unanimous decision.

On December 7, 2013, Frausto faced Vanessa Porto at Invicta FC 7: Honchak vs. Smith. Frausto lost the fight via unanimous decision.

Tachi Palace Fights 26
She defeated short notice replacement Corina Herrera via unanimous decision on February 18, 2016 at “Tachi Palace Fights 26: Brawl in the Hall” in Lemoore, California to end a 4 fight losing skid.

Combate Americas
After a hiatus that included a divorce and relocating to California, Frausto signed with Combate Americas and made her promotional debut against Jaimelene Nievera at Combate 31 on February 22, 2019. She won the fight via technical knockout in the first round.

As the second fight in the promotion she headlined Combate 41 against Reina Cordoba on August 2, 2019. She lost the bout via submission in the first round.

She is expected to headline Combate Americas' event on December 13, 2019.

Muay Thai
She defeated Linda Aguilar by second-round TKO in her Muay Thai debut at WCK Muay Thai: Matter of Pride in Temecula, California on February 15, 2014. She took a majority decision win over Jessica Gladstone at WCK Muay Thai: Beauty and the Beast in Lemoore, California on May 1, 2014. Frausto made her third appearance with the promotion against Lindsay Marino at World Championship Kickboxing: Ultimate Conquest on December 4, 2014. She won the fight by unanimous decision.

Championships and accomplishments
 Bellator Fighting Championships
 Bellator Women's Strawweight Championship (One time; First)
 Bellator Season 3 Women's Strawweight Tournament Winner
 Women's MMA Awards
 2010 Female Flyweight of the Year
 2010 Upset of the Year vs. Rosi Sexton on June 24
 2010 Headline of the Year defeating Megumi Fujii on October 28
 Grapplers Quest
 1st place, 2012 Grapplers Quest World Championships Women's No Gi Intermediate Openweight division

Kickboxing record

|-
|-  bgcolor="#CCFFCC"
| 2017-01-20 || Win || align=left |  Daniela Graf || Glory 37: Los Angeles || Los Angeles, California, US || Decision (unanimous) || 3 || 3:00 || 4-0
|-
|-  bgcolor="#CCFFCC"
| 2014-12-04 || Win || align=left |  Lindsay Marino || World Championship Kickboxing: Ultimate Conquest ||  || Decision (unanimous) || 5 || 3:00 || 3-0
|-
|-  bgcolor="#CCFFCC"
| 2014-05-01 || Win || align=left |  Jessica Gladstone || World Championship Kickboxing: Beauty and the Beast || Lemoore, California, United States || Decision (majority) || 4 || 3:00 || 2-0
|-
|-  bgcolor="#CCFFCC"
| 2014-02-15 || Win || align=left |  Linda Aguilar || World Championship Kickboxing: Matter of Pride || Temecula, California, United States || Retirement || 2 || 3:00 || 1-0
|-
| colspan=9 | Legend:

Mixed martial arts record

|-
| Loss
| align=center | 14–6
| Reina Cordoba
| Submission (armbar)
| Combate 41: Frausto vs. Cordoba
| 
| align=center | 1
| align=center | 2:32
| Fresno, California, United States
|
|-
| Win
| align=center | 14–5
| Jaimelene Nievera
| TKO (punches and knees)
| Combate 31: Mexico vs. USA
| 
| align=center | 1
| align=center | 1:52
| Fresno, California, United States
|
|-
| Win
| align=center | 13–5
| Corina Herrera
| Decision (unanimous)
| Tachi Palace Fights 26
| 
| align=center | 3
| align=center | 5:00
| Lemoore, California, United States
|
|-
| Loss
| align=center | 12–5
| Jocelyn Jones-Lybarger
| Decision (unanimous)
| RFA 31: Smith vs. Marunde
| 
| align=center | 5
| align=center | 5:00
| Las Vegas, Nevada, United States
| 
|-
| Loss
| align=center | 12–4
| Vanessa Porto
| Decision (unanimous)
| Invicta FC 7: Honchak vs. Smith
| 
| align=center | 3
| align=center | 5:00
| Kansas City, Missouri, United States
| 
|-
| Loss
| align=center | 12–3
| Jennifer Maia
| Decision (unanimous)
| Invicta FC 5: Penne vs. Waterson
| 
| align=center | 3
| align=center | 5:00
| Kansas City, Missouri, United States
| 
|-
| Loss
| align=center | 12–2
| Jessica Eye
| Technical Submission (standing arm-triangle choke)
| Bellator 83
| 
| align=center | 1
| align=center | 0:58
| Atlantic City, New Jersey, United States
| 
|-
| Win
| align=center | 12–1
| Casey Noland
| Decision (unanimous)
| Bellator 78
| 
| align=center | 3
| align=center | 5:00
| Dayton, Ohio, United States
| 
|-
| Win
| align=center | 11–1
| Karina Hallinan
| Decision (unanimous)
| Bellator 35
| 
| align=center | 3
| align=center | 5:00
| Lemoore, California, United States
| 
|-
| Win
| align=center | 10–1
| Megumi Fujii
| Decision (split)
| Bellator 34
| 
| align=center | 5
| align=center | 5:00
| Hollywood, Florida, United States
| 
|-
| Win
| align=center | 9–1
| Jessica Aguilar
| Decision (split)
| Bellator 31
| 
| align=center | 3
| align=center | 5:00
| Lake Charles, Louisiana, United States
| 
|-
| Win
| align=center | 8–1
| Jessica Penne
| Decision (unanimous)
| Bellator 25
| 
| align=center | 3
| align=center | 5:00
| Chicago, Illinois, United States
| 
|-
| Win
| align=center | 7–1
| Rosi Sexton
| KO (knee and punches)
| Bellator 23
| 
| align=center | 1
| align=center | 2:00
| Louisville, Kentucky, United States
| 
|-
| Win
| align=center | 6–1
| Michelle Ould
| Submission (ankle injury)
| The Warriors Cage 8: Meltdown
| 
| align=center | 2
| align=center | 2:42
| Porterville, California, United States
|
|-
| Loss
| align=center | 5–1
| Miesha Tate
| Submission (armbar)
| Strikeforce Challengers: Johnson vs. Mahe
| 
| align=center | 2
| align=center | 4:09
| Fresno, California, United States
|
|-
| Win
| align=center | 5–0
| Jessica Rakoczy
| Submission (armbar)
| TPF 3: Champions Collide
| 
| align=center | 2
| align=center | 1:17
| Lemoore, California, United States
|
|-
| Win
| align=center | 4–0
| Elisha Helsper
| Decision (unanimous)
| Strikeforce Challengers: Gurgel vs. Evangelista
| 
| align=center | 3
| align=center | 5:00
| Fresno, California, United States
|
|-
| Win
| align=center | 3–0
| Leann Jenkins
| Decision (unanimous)
| PureCombat 9: Home Turf
| 
| align=center | 3
| align=center | 5:00
| Visalia, California, United States
|
|-
| Win
| align=center | 2–0
| Sarah Boyd
| Decision (unanimous)
| Disturbing The Peace
| 
| align=center | 3
| align=center | 5:00
| Fresno, California, United States
|
|-
| Win
| align=center | 1–0
| Karina Hallinan
| Decision (split)
| Wargods/Ken Shamrock Productions: The Valentine's Eve Massacre
| 
| align=center | 3
| align=center | 3:00
| Fresno, California, United States
|

See also
 List of female mixed martial artists
 List of people from Fresno, California

References

External links
 Zoila Frausto Gurgel Awakening profile
 Official MySpace
 
Official Zoila Frausto Tee KO Page

<ref>

1983 births
Living people
American female taekwondo practitioners
Mixed martial artists from California
Bellator MMA champions
American female mixed martial artists
Flyweight mixed martial artists
Strawweight mixed martial artists
Mixed martial artists utilizing taekwondo
Mixed martial artists utilizing Muay Thai
Mixed martial artists utilizing Brazilian jiu-jitsu
American female kickboxers
Glory kickboxers
American mixed martial artists of Mexican descent
American Muay Thai practitioners
Female Muay Thai practitioners
American practitioners of Brazilian jiu-jitsu
Female Brazilian jiu-jitsu practitioners
People from Madera, California
21st-century American women